The Highest Bid is a 1916 American silent drama film directed by and starring William Russell and Charlotte Burton.

Cast
 Charlotte Burton as Elsie Burleigh
 William Russell as Oliver Strong
 William S. Hooser as Uncle Jerry
 Harry Keenan as Addison Grey
 Marie Van Tassell as Elsie's mother

External links

1916 films
1916 drama films
Silent American drama films
American silent feature films
American black-and-white films
1910s American films